Space Cruiser may refer to:

Space Battleship Yamato (1977 film), a Japanese anime film released as Space Cruiser in English
Space Cruiser, a 1981 arcade game by Taito
Toyota LiteAce, known as the Toyota Space Cruiser in some parts of Europe
List of fictional spacecraft, including multiple vehicles known as cruisers